Jovana Terzić (born May 15, 1999) is a Montenegrin swimmer. She competed at the 2016 Summer Olympics in the women's 100 metre freestyle event; her time of 59.59 seconds in the heats did not qualify her for the semifinals.

References

1999 births
Living people
Montenegrin female freestyle swimmers
Montenegrin female swimmers
European Games competitors for Montenegro
Swimmers at the 2015 European Games
Olympic swimmers of Montenegro
Swimmers at the 2016 Summer Olympics